The 1894 Alabama gubernatorial election took place on August 6, 1894, in order to elect the governor of Alabama.

Results

References

1894
gubernatorial
Alabama
August 1894 events